The lesser lophorina (Lophorina minor), also known as lesser superb bird-of-paradise or rasping bird-of-paradise, is a species of passerine bird in the bird-of-paradise family Paradisaeidae.

It is endemic to the Bird's Tail Peninsula (Papua New Guinea). It was formerly considered as a subspecies of the superb bird-of-paradise, and elevated to species rank in 2017.

References

Lesser lophorina
Birds of the Papuan Peninsula
Lesser lophorina